Karşıyaka Arena (also known as Mustafa Kemal Atatürk Karşıyaka Sport Hall) is a multi-purpose indoor arena in İzmir, Turkey. It was opened in 2005. It is owned and run by Karşıyaka SK. The 6,500 seating capacity arena is used mostly to host basketball and volleyball games, as well as concerts and events.

The arena also features a VIP lounge area with seating for 90, an additional practice training hall that seats 500 people, a weight training room, fitness and aerobics facilities, a conference room that holds 100 people, a media room for the press, a medical room, locker room facilities, 20 athlete guesthouses, cafeterias, administrative offices, a sports bar, and 800 parking spaces.

History
Karşıyaka Arena was built for the 2005 Summer Universiade, where it hosted 2005 Summer Universiade Basketball and 2005 Summer Universiade Volleyball. The arena was used to host the EuroChallenge 2012–13 season's Final Four tournament, where the tournament's home team, Pınar Karşıyaka, lost in the final to Krasnye Krylia.

External links
Exterior Image of Karşıyaka Arena
Interior Image 1 of Karşıyaka Arena
Interior Image 2 of Karşıyaka Arena
Interior Image 3 of Karşıyaka Arena

Basketball venues in Turkey
Indoor arenas in Turkey
Turkish Basketball League venues
Sports venues in İzmir
Volleyball venues in Turkey
Sports venues completed in 2005
Buildings and structures completed in 2005
21st-century architecture in Turkey